Laghu (pronounced ), also known as Hoatana or Katova, is an extinct language of Santa Isabel in the Solomon Islands. Its last speaker died in 1984. People in the villages of Baolo and Samasodu, where it used to be spoken, now speak the neighboring Zabana language, which is more widely spoken and still expanding (Palmer 2009:1-2).

References

 Palmer, Bill. 2009. Kokota Grammar. Oceanic Linguistics Special Publication No. 35. Honolulu: University of Hawaii Press. .

Languages of the Solomon Islands
Extinct languages of the Solomon Islands
Languages extinct in the 1980s
Ysabel languages